Furija (also Romanized as Fūrījā; also known as Pūrījā) is a village in Nowkand Kola Rural District, in the Central District of Qaem Shahr County, Mazandaran Province, Iran. At the 2006 census, its population was 24, in 10 families.

References 

Populated places in Qaem Shahr County